The White Eagle School is a co-educational English day and boarding school in Devpur Jakhwali, Kutch, in the Indian state of Gujarat.

History
The Eaglet Society, a precursor to the White Eagle School, was started in Mysore in 1934 by Rama Ramachandra Sinhji. The school was founded by a member of his family, Mahipat Sinhji, an alumnus and principal of Rajkumar College in Rajkot.

The White Eagle Senior Secondary School has been affiliated with the Central Board of Secondary Education (CBSE) since 1994. Under the CBSE, the school's code is 430027. However, CBSE affiliation is impermanent and the partnership may be cancelled at any time.

According to the school, "regular physical activities are offered at the school, where students participate in exercises and outdoor games like hockey, football, and cricket".

References

External links
White Eagles School home page

Educational institutions established in 1994
 Education in Kutch district
 High schools and secondary schools in Gujarat
1994 establishments in Gujarat